The Limmen Bight River is a river in the Northern Territory, Australia.

The headwaters rise at the base of the Favenc Range near O.T. Downs and Broadmere Stations. It then flows in a northerly direction, with many smaller tributaries feeding the river which forms a series of braided channels across the plains. It flows past Sculthorpe Pound and through Limmen Gate hemmed to the east by the Tawallah Range. It continues through Limmen National Park past the Four Archers near Burketown Crossing and eventually discharges in the Limmen Bight in the Gulf of Carpentaria. Fifteen tributaries join the river including October Creek, Balbirni Creek, Lansen Creek, Crooked Creek, Tyangkulta Creek, Cox River and Nathan River. It also flows through a large permanent billabong, Broadmere waterhole.

The tide-dominated delta has multiple channels and is surrounded by an area of  covered with mangroves.

The river was named after the Limmen Bight which it discharges into. The bight was named by the explorer Abel Tasman in 1644 after his ship, the Limmen.

See also

List of rivers of Northern Territory

References

Rivers of the Northern Territory
Arnhem Land
Gulf of Carpentaria